USS Unadilla may refer to one of the following ships of the United States Navy:

  was a 507-ton steam operated gunboat acquired by the Union Navy during the American Civil War.
  a district harbor tug laid down in 1895 and struck in 1947.
  a  serving from 1944 to 1961

United States Navy ship names